Dalabon is a Gunwinyguan language of Arnhem Land, Australia. It is a severely endangered language, with perhaps as few as three fluent speakers remaining as of 2018.
Dalabon is also known as Dangbon (the Kune or Mayali name), Ngalkbun (the Jawoyn name), and Buwan (the Rembarrnga name).

Classification
Dalabon belongs to the Gunwinyguan languages branch of the Australian languages, its nearest relatives are Kunwinjku, Kune, Mayali (varieties often grouped together as Bininj Kunwok) and Kunbarlang. Its next closest relatives are Rembarrnga, and other languages within the Gunwinyguan family, including Jawoyn, Ngalakgan, Ngandi, Wubuy, and Enindhilyakwa.

Official status
Dalabon has no official status. Local schools spent years to hold sporadic programs teaching Dalabon, but these operations didn't receive enough governmental support. Therefore, the condition of programs is still vulnerable.

Dialect/Varieties
Given the limited number of Dalabon speakers, the study of dialects has become challenging to investigate. Speakers recall a distinction between two different types of speech, dalabon-djurrkdjurrk ("fast", "lively") and dalabon-murduk ("articulate"). However, no significant difference has been found between the two speeches.

Phonology and Orthography

Consonants
There are 22 or 23 phonemic consonants in Dalabon, depending on the phonemic status of /h/. A table containing the consonant phonemes is given below with their orthographic representation (in angle brackets).

Vowels

There are 6 vowels in Dalabon. A table containing the vowel phonemes is given below with their orthographic representation (in angle brackets).

Phonotactics
Dalabon restricts the trilled [r] and long stops to only occur word-internally. Constraints regarding the edges of a phonological word also limit the glottal stop [ʔ] from occurring word-initially.

The syllable structure of Dalabon is CV(C)(C)(C), or more specifically:  

CV(L)(N)(h) or CV(L)(S)

where:
L is a liquid consonant (lateral or rhotic)
N is a nasal consonant
S is a peripheral consonant
h is a glottal consonant. 

Such complex codas are not unusual, and all combinations are enumerated as follows (words and translations taken from the dictionary).

Complex coda of two consonants

Complex coda of three consonants

Phonological processes
Dalabon has a pattern of eliding unstressed vowels and unstressed syllables. For example, the word /'cabale/ 'shoulder blade' is often realized as ['cable].

Prosody
The location of phrasal stress in Dalabon appears one or two peaks with an initial rise into the first peak at the left edge of the constituent and a final fall at the right edge of the constituent.

Grammar
Although there is no complete grammatical description of the language, a number of aspects of Dalabon grammar have been described, including its bound pronominal system, polysynthetic word structure, verb conjugations, the use of subordination strategies, nominal subclasses, the demonstrative system, and the use of optional ergativity.

Morphology
The structure of Dalabon verbs:

SEQ: sequential ‘and then’

CAUS: ‘because’

misc: various adverbial type prefixes

BEN: benefactive applicative

gin: ‘generic’ incorporated nouns

bpin: ‘body part’ incorporated nouns

num: ‘number’ prefixes

COM: comitative applicative

RR: Reflexive/reciprocal

TAM: tense/aspect mood

The diminutive enclitic =wurd is derived from noun wurd 'woman's child', its reduplication wurdurd means 'child'. 
wurd can attach to most word classes and functions in 3 ways of meaning: to denote small objects, to add emotional connotations and to serve as pragmatic functions (especially for interactional softening). The examples are shown below.

Syntax
Dalabon is a head-marking language. Dalabon has limited use of subordinate clauses, but it has a distinctive subordination strategy, which is to attach pronominal prefixes to the verb, and marked verbs are used for subordinate clause functions

subordinate1: the unmarked form of prefixes to show subordinate status, used when the status is overt by other means.

subordinate2: used when prefixes are the only way to show subordination.

dis: disharmonic, meaning odd-numbered generations.

Examples are shown below:

Vocabulary

References

Further reading
 Alpher, Barry. 1982. Dalabon dual-subject prefixes, kinship categories and generation skewing. In J. Heath, F. Merlan and A. Rumsey, eds, Languages of Kinship in Aboriginal Australia, 19-30. Sydney: Oceania Linguistic Monographs #24
 Cutfield, Sarah. 2011. Demonstratives in Dalabon: A language of southwestern Arnhem Land. (Doctoral dissertation, Monash University; xx+485pp.)
 Evans, Nicholas, Dunstan Brown & Greville Corbett. 2001. Dalabon pronominal prefixes and the typology of syncretism: a Network Morphology analysis. Yearbook of Morphology 2000, 187-231.
 Evans, Nicholas.  2006. Who said polysynthetic languages avoid subordination? Multiple subordination strategies in Dalabon. Australian Journal of Linguistics 26.1:31-58.
 Evans, Nicholas. 2007. Standing up your mind: remembering in Dalabon. In Mengistu Amberber (ed.) The language of memory in a crosslinguistic perspective. Amsterdam: John Benjamins. pp. 67–95.
 Evans, Nicholas, Janet Fletcher & Belinda Ross. 2008. Big words, small phrases: mismatches between pause units and the polysynthetic word in Dalabon. Linguistics 46.1:87-127.
 Evans, Nicholas & Francesca Merlan. 2003. Dalabon verb conjugations. In Nicholas Evans (ed.). The non-Pama-Nyungan languages of northern Australia: comparative studies of the continent’s most linguistically complex region. Canberra: Pacific Linguistics. pp. 269–283.
 Evans, Nicholas, Francesca Merlan & Maggie Tukumba. 2004. A first dictionary of Dalabon (Ngalkbon). Maningrida: Bawinanga Aboriginal Corporation. Pp. xxxviii + 489.
 
 Ponsonnet, Maïa. 2009. Aspects of the Semantics of Intellectual Subjectivity in Dalabon (South-Western Arnhem Land). Australian Aboriginal Studies, 2009/1:17-28. Canberra: Aboriginal Studies Press.

External links 
 Bibliography of Dalabon people and language resources, at the Australian Institute of Aboriginal and Torres Strait Islander Studies
 Dalabon collection at the Endangered Languages Archive
 Dalabon DoReCo corpus compiled by Maïa Ponsonnet. Audio recordings of narrative texts with transcriptions time-aligned at the phone level, translations, and - for some texts - time-aligned morphological annotations.

Gunwinyguan languages
Indigenous Australian languages in the Northern Territory